Van der Plank is a Dutch surname. Notable people with the surname include:

Marcel van der Plank (born 1951), Dutch politician
Wendy van der Plank (born 1963), British actress

Surnames of Dutch origin